Choristostigma is a genus of moths of the family Crambidae.

Species
Choristostigma disputalis (Barnes & McDunnough, 1917)
Choristostigma elegantalis Warren, 1892
Choristostigma erubescens (Hampson, 1899)
Choristostigma laetalis (Hampson, 1900)
Choristostigma leucosalis (Barnes & McDunnough, 1914)
Choristostigma particolor (Dyar, 1914)
Choristostigma perpulchralis 
Choristostigma plumbosignalis Fernald, 1888
Choristostigma roseopennalis (Hulst, 1886)
Choristostigma zephyralis

References

Spilomelinae
Crambidae genera
Taxa named by William Warren (entomologist)